Davide Bendinelli (born 19 October 1974 in Caprino Veronese) is an Italian politician from Veneto.

Having joined Forza Italia, he served as minister of the Province of Verona in 1999–2009 and mayor of Garda in 2001–2010. In the 2010 regional election he was elected to the Regional Council of Veneto for The People of Freedom and in 2014 he was appointed regional minister of Social Affairs in Zaia I Government.

References

1974 births
Living people
Forza Italia politicians
Members of the Regional Council of Veneto
The People of Freedom politicians
21st-century Italian politicians